The Gray Horizon is a 1919 American silent drama film directed by William Worthington. Sessue Hayakawa's Haworth Pictures Corporation produced the film and he himself played the lead role. Bertram Grassby, Tsuru Aoki, Eileen Percy, Mary Jane Irving, and Andrew Robson also featured in the film.

Plot
As described in a film magazine, the skill of colorful Japanese artist Yamo Masata (Hayakawa), who lives in the hills of California, attracts the attention of a clever counterfeiter who seeks the artist's aid in the preparation of spurious bonds. At first deceived, the artist becomes indignant when he learns the truth of the enterprise, and shows the man the door. The artist's sister, O Haru San (Aoki), who is newly arrived in America and is searching for the American husband who deserted her, identifies the stranger as her spouse. He seeks to escape but in the encounter that follows both the counterfeiter and the sister meet death. In time, the artist is taken up by society and becomes wealthy and famous. Then he discovers that his chief patroness Doris Furthman (Percy), a lady he has come to love, is the bigamous widow of the man the artist murdered. The lady's brother accuses the artist of evil designs and learns the truth about the murder. When the artist demands proof regarding the accusation, he discovers that the evidence will blast the life of the woman he has come to love, so the artist destroys the evidence and prepares to go to trial.

Cast
Sessue Hayakawa as Yamo Masata
Bertram Grassby as John Furthman
Eileen Percy as Doris Furthman
Tsuru Aoki as O Haru San
Mary Jane Irving as Kenneth Furthman
Andrew Robson as Robert Marsh

References

External links 

 

1919 drama films
Silent American drama films
American black-and-white films
Haworth Pictures Corporation films
American silent feature films
Film Booking Offices of America films
1919 films
1910s American films